Mount Hurd is a mountain in the Ottertail Range of the Canadian Rockies in British Columbia, Canada. It was named after Major Marshall Farnam Hurd (1823-1903) a Canadian Pacific Railway engineer and explorer. It was featured on a 1928 Canada Post 10¢ stamp based on a painting by Frederic Marlett Bell-Smith.


Climate
Based on the Köppen climate classification, Mount Hurd is located in a subarctic climate with cold, snowy winters, and mild summers. Temperatures can drop below −20 °C with wind chill factors below −30 °C. Precipitation runoff from Mount Hurd drains into tributaries of the Kicking Horse River which is a tributary of the Columbia River.

See also

Geography of British Columbia

References

External links
 Parks Canada web site: Yoho National Park

Canadian Rockies
Three-thousanders of British Columbia
Mountains of Yoho National Park
Kootenay Land District